The 2000–01 Los Angeles Kings season was the Kings' 34th season in the National Hockey League. The club made it to the playoffs, defeating Detroit in the first round before losing to Colorado in the second round.

Offseason

Regular season

Final standings

Schedule and results

Playoffs
The Kings beat the Detroit Red Wings four games to two in the first round after being down 0–2. This was LA's first playoff series win since defeating the Toronto Maple Leafs in the 1993 Campbell Conference Finals. However, they would lose to former captain Rob Blake and the Colorado Avalanche in seven games in the second round, as Colorado would go on to win the 2001 Stanley Cup.

Round 1: (2) Detroit Red Wings vs. (7) Los Angeles Kings

Round 2: (1) Colorado Avalanche vs. (7) Los Angeles Kings

Player statistics

Awards and records

Transactions
The Kings were involved in the following transactions during the 2000–01 season.

Trades

Free agent signings

Free agents lost

Expansion draft

Waivers

Draft picks
Los Angeles's draft picks at the 2000 NHL Entry Draft held at the Pengrowth Saddledome in Calgary, Alberta.

See also
2000–01 NHL season

References
 

Los
Los
Los Angeles Kings seasons
LA Kings
LA Kings